The Brave Archer 3, also known as Blast of the Iron Palm, is a 1981 Hong Kong film adapted from Louis Cha's novel The Legend of the Condor Heroes. The film was produced by the Shaw Brothers Studio and directed by Chang Cheh, starring Alexander Fu Sheng and Niu-niu in the lead roles. The film is the third part of a trilogy and was preceded by The Brave Archer (1977) and The Brave Archer 2 (1978). The film has two unofficial sequels, The Brave Archer and His Mate (1982) and Little Dragon Maiden (1983), both of which were based on The Return of the Condor Heroes. The theme song of the film, Say Cheung Kei (四張機), was composed by Chang Cheh, arranged by Joseph Koo and performed in Cantonese by Jenny Tseng.

Cast
 Alexander Fu Sheng as Guo Jing
 Niu-niu as Huang Rong
 Philip Kwok as Zhou Botong
 Yu Tai-ping as Yang Kang
 Yeung Hung as Wang Chongyang
 Ti Lung as Duan Zhixing
 Lau Wai-ling as Dali empress
 Ching Li as Liu Ying / Yinggu
 Lu Feng as Zhang Shaoshou
 Sun Chien as Zhu Ziliu
 Wong Lik as Wu Santong
 Chiang Sheng as Diancang Yuyin
 Lo Mang as Qiu Qianren
 Chu Ko as Qiu Li
 Siao Yuk
 Ricky Cheng
 Lau Fong-sai
 Ngai Tim-choi
 Tony Tam
 Lam Chi-tai
 Hung San-nam
 Lai Yau-hing
 Lam Wai
 Chow Kin-ping

External links
 
 

1981 films
Films based on works by Jin Yong
Hong Kong martial arts films
1980s Mandarin-language films
Shaw Brothers Studio films
Films set in the Jin dynasty (1115–1234)
Films set in the Mongol Empire
Films based on The Legend of the Condor Heroes
Wuxia films
Films directed by Chang Cheh
1980s Hong Kong films